Manuela Secolo (born 22 February 1977) is an Italian female volleyball player. She was part of the Italy women's national volleyball team. She competed with the national team at the 2004 Summer Olympics in Athens, Greece.

See also
 Italy at the 2004 Summer Olympics

References

External links
 Profile at the Fédération Internationale de Volleyball

1977 births
Competitors at the 2009 Mediterranean Games
Italian women's volleyball players
Living people
Mediterranean Games gold medalists for Italy
Mediterranean Games medalists in volleyball
Olympiacos Women's Volleyball players
Olympic volleyball players of Italy
Place of birth missing (living people)
Volleyball players at the 2004 Summer Olympics
Volleyball players at the 2008 Summer Olympics